Zahav or zehaw is a Kurdish region in Sarpeli zehaw city in Iran (sarpol-E-zahab in Persian pronunciation)
 Zahawi or zahavi is one of the common family name in this city .
This city was one of common Jewish city in Iran but during the times mostly of them moved to Israel.

Zahavi or Zehavi is one of the common Hebrew translations for the Ashkenazi Jewish last names Goldman, Goldstein, and Goldberg. It can refer to:

 Alex Zahavi (born 1991), American-born Israeli former footballer
 Amotz Zahavi and Avishag Zahavi, evolutionary biologists; Amotz theorized the handicap principle
 Dan Zahavi, Danish philosopher
 Ephraim Zehavi, Israeli engineer
 Eran Zahavi (born 1987), Israeli footballer playing for PSV Eindhoven
 Helen Zahavi, English author
 Pini Zahavi, Israeli football agent